Dush (also known as Dushi, Dusi-Eper, and Dushi i Epërmë) is a village in the former Qerret municipality, Shkodër County, northern Albania. At the 2015 local government reform it became part of the municipality Pukë.

Notes

External links
 Geonames Gazetteer (GNIS) GUID: 32FA884CF5CB3774E0440003BA962ED3
 "Dush, Albania" Falling Rain Genomics, Inc.

Populated places in Pukë
Villages in Shkodër County